The R&D Tunnel, or Boring Test Tunnel is a  tunnel in Hawthorne, California for testing hyperloop and "loop-based transportation". It was completed by The Boring Company in late 2018. The single-bore tunnel was constructed during 2017 and 2018 using a  diameter tunnel boring machine, giving a finished  internal diameter.

Route 

Most of the route runs outside and set back from the perimeter of Hawthorne Municipal Airport, with a very short section under the corner of the airport fence, without going under the runway.

The tunnel starts between the Dominguez Channel storm drain and Crenshaw Boulevard at an entrance pit constructed on parking lot land owned by SpaceX.  A short straight section heading northwards is followed by a  curve westwards under West 120th Street, then a long straight tunnel, a slight curve and a final short straight to the Exit Shaft.  The midpoint of the tunnel is planned to connect with a very short northwards spur to a small car parking system-style car elevator leading up inside a residential garage behind a house at 3834 West 119th Place.

Timeline
On December 17, 2016, Elon Musk, the founder of the Boring Company, stated that he was frustrated with traffic jams, and would start building a tunnel.  By April 2017, The Boring Company had obtained a second-hand tunnel boring machine, transported the machine to Hawthorne, and had it repainted in Boring Company colors.

On January 31, 2018, The Boring Company acquired the land around a family house at 3834 West 119th Place for $500,000.  On May 9, 2018, The Boring Company acquired land on the corner of West 120th and Prairie Avenue for $2 million, purchasing the corner plots 309 and 308 at 12007 Prairie Avenue And Plots 304‒307 behind.

Permission for the first  of tunnel under SpaceX's own land had been obtained earlier.

On October 17, 2018, in preparation for opening "The Brick Store", the company applied for permission to paint the building at 12003 Prairie Avenue in The Boring Company black-and-white corporate colors.

An opening ceremony for the test tunnel was originally scheduled for December 10, 2018, Then moved to December 18, 2018.

Operation
During the launch day on December 18, 2018, cars operated using guided busway-style side-facing guide wheels.

References

External links

 

 
 
 
 

The Boring Company
Tunnels in Los Angeles
Transportation buildings and structures in Los Angeles
Road tunnels in California
2018 establishments in California
Tunnels completed in 2018
All pages needing cleanup